Epcot Forever is a fireworks show that premiered on October 1, 2019, at Epcot. Epcot Forever served as an interim replacement for IllumiNations: Reflections of Earth until its long-term replacement, Harmonious, premiered in 2021. It took the form of a celebration of Epcot's musical history. The show celebrated the park's 37-year history, featuring fireworks, music, lighting, lasers, and special effects kites set to new arrangements of music originating from some of the park's classic attractions, such as Journey Into Imagination, Spaceship Earth, Soarin', Tapestry of Nations and Universe of Energy. The show was also made to celebrate the past, present, and future of Epcot.

The show closed on March 16, 2020 due to the COVID-19 pandemic but reopened on June 29, 2021 alongside the return of the Happily Ever After fireworks show. However, on January 10, 2023, Disney announced the show will return to Epcot beginning April 3, 2023,  as part of the Disney 100 Years of Wonder celebration, replacing its successor, Harmonious, which will play its last show the night prior.

Show summary 

Epcot Forever was structured around medley of Epcot music and the voices of children quoting different attractions, with some archival audio of Walt Disney from the EPCOT film also being incorporated into the opening and closing.

 Opening
 "Legacy" (Epcot entrance plaza theme)
 "One Little Spark" (from Journey into Imagination)
 "We've Just Begun to Dream" (from EPCOT Center Grand Opening)
 Innovation ("Welcome to the future... or, should I say, your future!" – Spaceship Earth)
 "New Horizons" (from Horizons)
 "Universe of Energy" (from Universe of Energy)
 "Listen to the Land" (from Listen to the Land)
 "New Horizons" (reprise, from Horizons)
 Exploration ("Soarin' to tower, we are ready for takeoff!" – Soarin')
 "Tomorrow's Child" (from Spaceship Earth)
 "Soarin' Over California" (from Soarin')
 "Magic Journeys" (from Magic Journeys)
 "Tomorrow's Child" (reprise, from Spaceship Earth)
 Imagination ("And so, as you can plainly see, imagination works best when it's set free!" – Journey Into Imagination)
 "One Little Spark" (reprise, from Journey into Imagination)
 "Makin' Memories" (from Magic Journeys pre-show)
 "Veggie, Veggie, Fruit, Fruit" (from Kitchen Kabaret)
 "It's Fun to Be Free" (from World of Motion)
 Celebration ("May peace go with you forever and ever as you celebrate the future hand in hand" – Tapestry of Nations)
 "Tapestry of Nations" (from Tapestry of Nations)
 "Golden Dream" (from The American Adventure)
 "Celebrate the Future, Hand in Hand" (from the Walt Disney World Millennium Celebration)
 Finale
 "One Little Spark" (reprise with new lyrics, from Journey into Imagination)
 "A Whole New World" (from Aladdin)

Special editions

New Year's Eve Countdown Edition 
On December 31, 2019, this segment continued to be used after IllumiNations: Reflections of Earth, which is the tag returned on New Year's Eve 2020.

References

Further reading

 "After two decades and numerous awards, tonight is the final 'IllumiNations' show at Epcot", Orlando Weekly (Sept 30, 2019)
 "Why Epcot Forever music is the "soul" of Disney's new show", Orlando Business Journal (Sept 29, 2019)
 "New "Epcot Forever" Fireworks Show Debuts at Disney World", Orlando News 13 (Oct 2, 2019)
 "Pictures: Disney's new 'Epcot Forever' fireworks show", Orlando Sentinel (Oct 1, 2019)
 "‘Epcot Forever’ nighttime spectacular debuts at Walt Disney World Resort", Attractions Magazine (Oct 3, 2019)
 "Epcot Forever debuts at Walt Disney World", Theme Park Insider (Oct 1, 2019)
 "Here's What We REALLY Thought About Epcot Forever, Epcot's New Nighttime Spectacular", Theme Park Tourist (Oct 2, 2019)
 "Five Surprising Elements in Epcot Forever", Touring Plans (Oct 5, 2019)
 "Epcot Forever Review: You Can’t Go Home Again", Disney Tourist Blog (Oct 12, 2019)
 "First Look: Scenes from Opening Night of Epcot Forever", AllEars.net (Oct 1, 2019)

Amusement park attractions introduced in 2019
Amusement park attractions that closed in 2021
Epcot
World Showcase
2019 establishments in Florida
2021 disestablishments in Florida
Walt Disney Parks and Resorts fireworks